Devalamma Naagaram is a village in Yadadri  in Telangana, India. It falls under Choutuppal mandal. This village falls under Munugodu assembly and Bhongir parliament constitution.

References

Villages in Nalgonda district